DXXX (1008 AM) Radyo Ronda is a radio station owned and operated by Radio Philippines Network. The station's studios are located at the 3rd floor, Fairland Property Bldg., Mayor Vitaliano Agan St. (Nuñez Ext.), Zamboanga City.

History
The station was established in 1959 as DXJW under 1010 kHz. It was owned by Alto Broadcasting System of A.J. Wills, which became ABS-CBN in 1967. On September 23, 1972, it was among the stations closed down by the government. The following year, it returned on air, this time under its current call letters and current ownership.

References

External links
Radyo Ronda Zamboanga FB Page
Radyo Ronda Zamboanga Website

Radio Philippines Network
RPN News and Public Affairs
Radio stations in Zamboanga City
Radio stations established in 1959
News and talk radio stations in the Philippines